Bakeyevo (Baqıy) is a rural locality (a selo) in Zigazinsky Selsoviet, Beloretsky District, Bashkortostan, Russia. The population was 73 as of 2010. There is 1 street.

Geography 
Bakeyevo is located 266 km west of Beloretsk (the district's administrative centre) by road. Khaybullino is the nearest rural locality.

References 

Rural localities in Beloretsky District